Evelyn Laye  (née Elsie Evelyn Lay; 10 July 1900 – 17 February 1996) was an English actress who was active on the London light opera stage, and later in New York and Hollywood. Her first husband, actor Sonnie Hale, left her for Jessie Matthews, earning much public sympathy for Laye. Her second husband was actor Frank Lawton, with whom she often appeared in stage productions.

Early years
Laye was born as Elsie Evelyn Lay in Bloomsbury, London, and known informally as Boo. Her parents were both actors and her father a theatre manager.

Career 
Lay made her first stage appearance in August 1915 at the Theatre Royal, Brighton as Nang-Ping in Mr. Wu, and her first London appearance at the East Ham Palace on 24 April 1916, aged 15, in the revue Honi Soit, in which she subsequently toured.

For the first few years of her career she mainly played in musical comedy and operetta, including The Beauty Spot in 1917 and Going Up in 1918. Among her successes during the 1920s were Phi-Phi (1922), Madame Pompadour (1923), The Dollar Princess, Blue Eyes (1928) and Lilac Time.

Laye made her Broadway debut in 1929 in the American première of Noël Coward's Bitter Sweet and appeared in several early Hollywood film musicals. She continued acting in pantomimes such as The Sleeping Beauty and Cinderella. In 1937, she appeared opposite Richard Tauber in the C.B. Cochran production of the operetta Paganini by Franz Lehár, at the Lyceum Theatre and on tour.  Laye performed with an unnamed dog for the VE Day edition of BBC's Music Hall.

After the Second World War, Laye had less success, but she returned to the West End in 1954, in the musical Wedding in Paris. She also acted several times opposite her second husband, actor Frank Lawton, including in the 1956 sitcom My Husband and I. Other stage successes included Silver Wedding (1957; with Lawton), The Amorous Prawn (1959) and Phil the Fluter (1969).

She was the subject of This Is Your Life on two occasions, in August 1959 when she was surprised by Eamonn Andrews at the BBC Television Theatre, and in December 1990, when Michael Aspel surprised her at Croydon's Fairfield Halls.

Personal life
Married to the actor Sonnie Hale in 1926, Laye received widespread public sympathy when Hale left her for the actress Jessie Matthews in 1928. She was initially very reluctant to abandon the marriage, but, despite a trial reconciliation, a divorce case eventually followed in 1930. She subsequently married actor Frank Lawton, to whom she remained married until his death.

Honours
Awarded a CBE in 1973, Laye continued acting well into her nineties. It was reported after Laye's death that the Queen Mother had petitioned the then Prime Minister John Major for Laye to be awarded the DBE (damehood).

Death
Laye died in a nursing home in Pimlico, Central London from respiratory failure in 1996, aged 95.

Filmography
 The Luck of the Navy (1927) - Cynthia Eden
 One Heavenly Night (1931) - Lilli
 Waltz Time (1933) - Rosalinde Eisenstein
 Princess Charming (1934) - Princess Elaine
 Evensong (1934) - Madame Irela
 The Night Is Young (1935) - Elizabeth Katherine Anne 'Lisl' Gluck
 I'll Turn to You (1946) - Herself (uncredited)
 Make Mine a Million (1959) - Herself, Cameo appearance
 Theatre of Death (1967) - Madame Angelique
 Love, I Think (1970) - Cynthia Pitman
 Say Hello to Yesterday (1971) - Woman's mother
 Never Never Land (1980) - Millie
My Family and Other Animals (1987) - Mrs. Kralefsky

References

External links
 Performances listed in Theatre Archive, University of Bristol
 
 
 Photographs and literature
 Evelyn Laye's 90th Birthday at The Players' Theatre, London
WP:ELNO

1900 births
1996 deaths
Commanders of the Order of the British Empire
Deaths from respiratory failure
English film actresses
English musical theatre actresses
English stage actresses
People from Bloomsbury
20th-century English actresses
20th-century English singers
20th-century English women singers
Actresses from London